The decline of Celtic languages in England was the historical process by which the Celtic languages died out in what is modern-day England. It happened in most of southern Great Britain between about 400 and 1000 AD, but in Cornwall, it was finished only in the 18th century.

Prior to about the 5th century AD, most people in Britain spoke Insular Celtic languages (for the most part, specifically Brittonic languages), but Vulgar Latin may have taken over in larger settlements (e.g. Londinium), especially in the southeast, which were administered by the Roman Provincia Britannia. The fundamental reason for the demise of those languages in early medieval England was the migration of Germanic settlers, known as Anglo-Saxons, who spoke West Germanic dialects that are now known collectively as Old English, particularly around the 5th century, during the collapse of Roman power in Britain. Gradually, those Celtic-speakers who did not flee to Brittany or to highland zones within Britain switched to speaking Old English until Celtic languages were no longer extensively spoken in what became England.

However, the precise processes by which that shift happened have been much debated, not least because the situation was strikingly different from, for example, post-Roman Gaul, Iberia or North Africa, where Germanic-speaking invaders gradually switched to local languages. Explaining the rise of Old English is therefore crucial in any account of cultural change in post-Roman Britain and in particular to understanding the Anglo-Saxon settlement of Britain. The rise of Old English is an important aspect of the history of English as well as the history of the Celtic languages.

Debate continues over whether a mass migration event, resulting in large-scale population shift, is the best explanation for the change seen during that period, or whether a political takeover by a small number of Anglo-Saxons could have driven a settled Brittonic-speaking majority to adopt Old English. Recently, scholars have proposed that both of those processes could have occurred in different regions and at different times.

Chronology

Fairly-extensive information about language in Roman Britain is available from Roman administrative documents attesting to place- and personal-names, along with archaeological finds such as coins, the Bloomberg and Vindolanda tablets, and Bath curse tablets. That shows that most inhabitants spoke British Celtic and/or British Latin. The influence and position of British Latin declined when the Roman economy and administrative structures collapsed in the early 5th century.

There is little direct evidence for the linguistic situation in Britain for the next few centuries. However, by the 8th century, when extensive evidence for the language situation in England is next available, it is clear that the dominant language was what is today known as Old English. There is no serious doubt that Old English was brought to Britain primarily during the 5th and 6th centuries by settlers from what is now the Netherlands, north-western Germany, and southern Denmark who spoke various dialects of Germanic languages and who came to be known as Anglo-Saxons. The language that emerged from the dialects they brought to Britain is today known as Old English. There is evidence for Britons moving westward and across the channel to form Brittany, but those who remained in what became England switched to speaking Old English until Celtic languages were no longer extensively spoken there. Celtic languages continued to be spoken in other parts of the British Isles, such as Wales, Scotland, Ireland and Cornwall. Only a few English words of Brittonic origin appear to have entered Old English.

Because the main evidence for events in Britain during the crucial period (400–700) is archaeological and seldom reveals linguistic information, and written evidence even after 700 remains patchy, the precise chronology of the spread of Old English is uncertain. However, Kenneth Jackson combined historical information from texts like Bede's Ecclesiastical History of the English People (731) with evidence for the linguistic origins of British river names to suggest the following chronology, which remains broadly accepted (see map):

 In Area I, Celtic names are rare and confined to large and medium-sized rivers. This area corresponds to English language dominance up to c. 500–550.
 Area II shows English-language dominance c. 600.
 Area III, where even many small streams have Brittonic names, shows English-language dominance c. 700.
 In Area IV, Brittonic remained the dominant language until at least the Norman Conquest, and river names are overwhelmingly Celtic.

Although Cumbric, in the north-west, seems to have died during the 11th century, Cornish continued to thrive until the early modern period and retreated at only around 10 km per century. However, from about 1500, Cornish–English bilingualism became increasingly common, and Cornish retreated at closer to 30 km per century. Cornish fell out of use entirely during the 18th century though the last few decades have seen an attempted revival.

During that period, England was also home to influential communities speaking Latin, Old Irish, Old Norse and Anglo-Norman. None of those seem to have been a major long-term competitor to English and Brittonic, however.

Debate on whether British Celtic was being displaced by Latin before the arrival of English

There is an ongoing discussion about the character of British Celtic and the extent of Latin-speaking in Roman Britain. It is now agreed that British Latin was spoken as a native language in Roman Britain and that at least some of the dramatic changes that the Brittonic languages underwent around the 6th century were due to Latin-speakers switching language to Celtic, possibly as Latin speakers moved away from encroaching Germanic-speaking settlers. It seems likely that Latin was the language of most of the townspeople; the administration and the ruling class; the military; and, following the no place for reconsideration, or revocation, except through revolution of Christianity, the church. However, British Celtic probably remained the language of the peasantry, which was the bulk of the population; the rural elite was probably bilingual. However, at the most extreme, it has been suggested that Latin became the prevalent language of lowland Britain in which case the story of Celtic language death in what is now England begins with its extensive displacement by Latin.

Thomas Toon has suggested that if the population of Roman Lowland Britain was bilingual in both Brittonic and Latin, such a multilingual society might adapt to the use of a third language, such as that spoken by the Germanic Anglo-Saxons, more readily than would a monoglot population.

Debate on why is there so little Brittonic influence on English

Old English shows little obvious influence from Celtic or spoken Latin: there are vanishingly few English words of Brittonic origin.

The traditional explanation for the lack of Celtic influence on English, supported by uncritical readings of the accounts of Gildas and Bede, is that Old English became dominant primarily because Germanic-speaking invaders killed, chased away, and/or enslaved the previous inhabitants of the areas that they settled. In recent decades, a number of specialists have maintained support for similar interpretations, and variations on that theme continue to feature in standard histories of the language. Peter Schrijver has said that "to a large extent, it is linguistics that is responsible for thinking in terms of drastic scenarios" about demographic change in late Roman Britain.

The development of contact linguistics in the later 20th century, which involved study of present-day language contact in well-understood social situations, gave scholars new ways to interpret the situation in early medieval Britain. Meanwhile, archaeological and genetic research suggest that a complete demographic change is unlikely to have taken place in 5th-century Britain. Textual sources hint that people who are portrayed as ethnically Anglo-Saxon actually had British connections: the West Saxon royal line was supposedly founded by a man named Cerdic, whose name derives from the Brittonic Caraticos (cf. Welsh Ceredig), whose supposed descendants Ceawlin and Caedwalla (d. 689) also had Brittonic names. The British name Caedbaed is found in the pedigree of the kings of Lindsey. The names of King Penda and some other kings of Mercia have more obvious Brittonic than Germanic etymologies, but they do not correspond to known Welsh personal names. The early Northumbrian churchmen Chad of Mercia (a prominent bishop) and his brothers Cedd (also a bishop), Cynibil and Caelin, along with the supposedly first composer of Christian English verse, Cædmon, also have Brittonic names.

Thus, a contrasting model of elite acculturation has been proposed in which a politically dominant but numerically insignificant number of Old English speakers drove large numbers of Britons to adopt Old English. In that theory, if Old English became the most prestigious language in a particular region, speakers of other languages there would have sought to become bilingual, and over a few generations, they stopped speaking the less prestigious languages (in this case, British Celtic and/or British Latin). The collapse of Britain's Roman economy seems to have left Britons living in a society technologically similar to that of their Anglo-Saxon neighbours, which made it unlikely that Anglo-Saxons would need to borrow words for unfamiliar concepts. Sub-Roman Britain saw a greater collapse in Roman institutions and infrastructure, compared to the situation in Roman Gaul and Hispania, perhaps especially after 407 AD, when it is probable that most or all of the Roman field army stationed in Britain was withdrawn to support the continental ambitions of Constantine III. That would have led to a more dramatic reduction in the status and prestige of the Romanized culture in Britain and so the incoming Anglo-Saxons had little incentive to adopt British Celtic or Latin, and the local people were more likely to abandon their languages in favour of the now-higher-status language of the Anglo-Saxons. In those circumstances, it is plausible that Old English would borrow few words from the lower-status language(s).

Critics of that model point out that in most cases, minority elite classes have not been able to impose their languages on a settled population. Furthermore, the archaeological and genetic evidence has cast doubt upon theories of expulsion and ethnic cleansing but also has tended not to support the idea that the extensive change seen in the post-Roman period was simply the result of acculturation by a ruling class. In fact, many of the initial migrants seem to have been families, rather than warriors, with significant numbers of women taking part and elites not emerging until the sixth century. In light of that, the emerging consensus among historians, archaeologists and linguists is that the Anglo-Saxon settlement of Britain was not a single event and thus cannot be explained by any one particular model. In the core areas of settlement in the south and east, for example, large-scale migration and population change seem to be the best explanations. In the peripheral areas to the northwest, on the other hand, a model of elite dominance may be the most fitting. In that view, therefore, the decline of Brittonic and British Latin in England can be explained by a combination of migration, displacement and acculturation in different contexts and areas.

One idiosyncratic explanation for the spread of English that has gained extensive popular attention is Stephen Oppenheimer's 2006 suggestion that the lack of Celtic influence on English is caused by the ancestor of English being already widely spoken in Britain by the Belgae before the end of the Roman period. However, Oppenheimer's ideas have not been found helpful in explaining the known facts since there is no solid evidence for a well established Germanic language in Britain before the fifth century, it is unclear whether the Belgae even spoke a Germanic language and the idea contradicts the extensive evidence for the use of Celtic and Latin.

Daphne Nash-Briggs has theorized that the Iceni might have been at least partially Germanic-speaking. In her view, their tribal name and some of the personal names found on their coins have more obvious Germanic derivations than Celtic ones. Richard Coates has disputed this assertion by arguing that while a satisfactory Celtic derivation for the tribal name has not been reached, it is "clearly not Germanic."

Question of detecting substratal Celtic influence on English

Supporters of the acculturation model in particular must account for the fact that in the case of a fairly-swift language-shift, involving second-language acquisition by adults, the learners' imperfect acquisition of the grammar and the pronunciation of the new language will affect it in some way. As yet, there is no consensus that such effects are visible in the surviving evidence in the case of English. Thus, one synthesis concluded that 'the evidence for Celtic influence on Old English is somewhat sparse, which only means that it remains elusive, not that it did not exist'.

Although there is little consensus about the findings, extensive efforts have been made during the 21st century to identify substrate influence of Brittonic on English.

Celtic influence on English has been suggested in several forms:
 Phonology. Between c. 450 and c. 700, Old English vowels underwent many changes, some of them unusual (such as the changes known as 'breaking'). It has been argued that some of these changes are a substrate effect caused by speakers of British Celtic adopting Old English during that period.
 Morphology. Old English morphology underwent a steady simplification during the Old English period and beyond into the Middle English period. That would be characteristic of influence by an adult-learner population. Some simplifications that become visible only in Middle English may have entered low-status varieties of Old English earlier but appeared in higher-status written varieties only at the late date.
 Syntax. Over centuries, English has gradually acquired syntactic features in common with Celtic languages (such as the use of 'periphrastic "do" '). Some scholars have argued that they reflect early Celtic influence, which, however, became visible in the textual record only later on. Substrate influence on syntax is considered especially likely during language shifts.

However, various challenges have been put forth regarding these suggestions:
 The sound changes in Old English bear no clear resemblance to any that occurred in Brittonic, and phenomena similar to 'breaking' have been found in Old Frisian and Old Norse. Other scholars have proposed that the changes were the result of dialect contact and levelling among Germanic speakers in the period following their settlement.
 There is no evidence for a Celtic-influenced low status variety of English in the Anglo-Saxon period (in comparison, the lingua romana rustica is referenced in Gaulish sources).
 It has been argued that the geographical patterns of morphological simplification make little sense when they are viewed as a Brittonic influence but match perfectly with areas of Viking settlement, which made contact with Old Norse be the more likely reason for the change.
 Syntactical features in English that resemble those found in modern Celtic languages did not become common until the Early Modern English period. It has been argued that is far too late of an appearance for substrate features and thus they are most likely internal developments, or possibly later contact influences.
 The English features and the Celtic ones they are theorized to have originated from often do not have clear parallels in usage.

Coates has concluded that the strongest candidates for potential substrate features can be seen in regional dialects in the north and the west of England (roughly corresponding to Area III in Jackson's chronology), such as the Northern Subject Rule.

Debate on why are there so few etymologically Celtic place-names in England

Place-names are traditionally seen as important evidence for the history of language in post-Roman Britain for three main reasons:
 It is widely assumed that even when first attested later, names were often coined in the settlement period.
 Although it is not clear who in society determined what places were called, place-names may reflect the usage of a broader section of the population than written texts.
 Place-names provide evidence for language in regions for which we lack written sources.
Post-Roman place-names in England begin to be attested from around 670, pre-eminently in Anglo-Saxon charters; they have been intensively surveyed by the English and the Scottish Place-Name Societies.

Except in Cornwall, the vast majority of place-names in England are easily etymologised as Old English (or Old Norse from later Viking influence), which demonstrates the dominance of English across post-Roman England. That is often seen as evidence for a cataclysmic cultural and demographic shift at the end of the Roman period in which not only the Brittonic and Latin languages but also Brittonic and Latin place-names and even Brittonic- and Latin-speakers were swept away.

In recent decades, research on Celtic toponymy, driven by the development of Celtic studies and particularly by Andrew Breeze and Richard Coates, has complicated that picture. More names in England and southern Scotland have Brittonic or occasionally Latin etymologies than was once thought. Earlier scholars often did not notice that because they were unfamiliar with Celtic languages. For example, Leatherhead was once etymologised as Old English lēod-rida, meaning "place where people [can] ride [across the river]". However, lēod has never been discovered in place-names before or since, and *ride 'place suitable for riding' was merely speculation. Coates showed that Brittonic lēd-rïd 'grey ford' was more plausible. In particular, there are clusters of Cumbric place-names in northern Cumbria and to the north of the Lammermuir Hills. Even so, it is clear that Brittonic and Latin place-names in the eastern half of England are extremely rare; although they are noticeably more common in the western half, they are still a tiny minority: 2% in Cheshire, for example.

Likewise, some entirely Old English names explicitly point to Roman structures, usually using Latin loan-words or to the presence of Brittonic-speakers. Names like Wickham clearly denoted the kind of Roman settlement known in Latin as a vicus, and others end in elements denoting Roman features, such as -caster, denoting castra ('forts'). There is a substantial body of names along the lines of Walton/Walcot/Walsall/Walsden, many of which must include the Old English word wealh in the sense 'Celtic-speaker', and Comberton, many of which must include Old English Cumbre 'Britons'. Those are likely to have been names for enclaves of Brittonic-speakers but again are not that numerous.

In the last decade, however, some scholars have stressed that Welsh and Cornish place-names from the Roman period seem no more likely to survive than Roman names in England: 'clearly name loss was a Romano-British phenomenon, not just one associated with Anglo-Saxon incomers'. Therefore, other explanations for the replacement of Roman period place-names which allow for a less cataclysmic shift to English naming include:
 Adaptation rather than replacement. Names that came to look as if they were coined as Old English may actually come from Roman ones. For example, the Old English name for the city of York, Eoforwīc (earlier *Eburwīc), transparently means 'boar-village'. We know that the first part of the name was borrowed from the earlier Romanised Celtic name Eburacum only because that earlier name is one of relatively few Roman British place-names that were recorded. Otherwise, we would have assumed that the Old English name was coined from scratch. (Likewise, the Old English name was, in turn, adapted into Norse as Jórvík, which transparently means 'horse-bay', and again, it would not be obvious that was based on an earlier Old English name if that had not been recorded.)
 In addition, several plausibly Brittonic place- and river-names in northern England appear to have their naming elements at least partly replaced by Old English, Old Norse and French ones, and in some cases, the older forms appear on historical record. Such names include Alkincoats, Cambois, Carrycoats, Drumburgh (< Drumboch), Fontburn, Gilcrux, Glenridding, Lanchester, Manchester, Penshaw (< Pencher), Tranewath and Wharfe.
 Invisible multilingualism. Place-names that survive only in Old English form may have had Brittonic counterparts for long periods without those being recorded. For example, the Welsh name of York, Efrog, derives independently from the Roman Eboracum, and other Brittonic names for English places might also have continued in parallel to the English ones.
 In addition, several toponyms are still known by both Celtic and English names, such as Blencathra/Saddleback and Catlowdy/Lairdstown. Other non-Celtic place-names with recorded Celtic forms include Bamburgh (Din Guoaroy) and Maiden Castle (Carthanacke).
 Some settlement names may contain earlier Celtic names for rivers that now have English or Norse ones. Such settlement names include Auckland, Cark, Leeds, Penrith and Tintwistle.
 Later evidence for place-names may not be as indicative of naming in the immediate post-Roman period as was once assumed. In names attested up to 731, 26% are etymologically partly non-English, and 31% have since fallen from use. Settlements and land tenure may have been relatively unstable in the post-Roman period, which led to a high natural rate of place-name replacement and enabled names coined in the increasingly-dominant English language to replace names inherited from the Roman period relatively swiftly.

Thus, place-names are important for showing the swift spread of English across England and also provide important glimpses into details of the history of Brittonic and Latin in the region, but they do not demand a single or simple model for explaining the spread of English.

See also

 Sub-Roman Britain
 Anglo-Saxon settlement of Britain
 History of English
 Brittonicisms in English
 List of English words of Brittonic origin
 Brittonic languages
 Last speaker of the Cornish language
 Language shift

References

Brittonic languages
Decline in England
Decline in England
Unsolved problems in linguistics
Cultural assimilation
English language
History of the English language
Brythonic Celts
Cultural history of England
Sub-Roman Britain